Ellachipur Sanman is a variety of chili pepper grown mainly in the Amravati district of Maharashtra state, central India. When dried, the chilis turn a dark red color and develop an intense, fiery flavor.

References

Chili peppers
Amravati district
Agriculture in Maharashtra